Camel Through the Eye of a Needle is a 1936 Czech comedy film directed by and starring Hugo Haas. The title is an allusion to the "eye of a needle" aphorism. It's a second movie adaptation of the play by František Langer after the 1926 film Never the Twain.

Plot
Alík, son of a wealthy chocolate factory owner Adolf Vilím, is set to marry Nina Štěpánková from a wealthy family. But Alík is not interested in Nina. He gets to know the beggar Pešta and his falls in love with his step-daughter Zuzka.

Cast
Hugo Haas as Beggar Josef Pešta 
Antonie Nedošínská as Aloise Peštová 
Jiřina Štěpničková as Zuzka Peštová 
Rudolf Deyl Sr. as Adolf Vilím 
Pavel Herbert as Alík Vilím 
Oldřich Nový as Butler Alfons 
Eduard Blažek as Secretary
Růžena Šlemrová as Mrs. Štěpánová 
Adina Mandlová as Nina Štěpánová 
Jindřich Plachta as Pavel Bezchyba 
Jan Pivec as Fred Krupička
Božena Šustrová as Nina's friend

See also
Never the Twain (1926)

References

External links 
 

1936 comedy films
1936 films
Czech black-and-white films
Czechoslovak black-and-white films
Czechoslovak comedy films
1930s Czech-language films
Films directed by Otakar Vávra
Sound film remakes of silent films
1930s Czech films